The following is a family tree of gods, goddesses, and other divine and semi-divine figures from Ancient Greek mythology and Ancient Greek religion.

Key: The names of the generally accepted Olympians are given in bold font.Key: The names of the twelve first-generation Titans have a green background.

See also
 Greek mythology
 List of Greek mythological figures
 List of Greek mythological creatures
 Hesiod’s Theogony

Notes

References

External Links
 Theoi: Greek Gods Family Tree

Greek
